The name Summilux is used by Leica and Panasonic Lumix to designate camera lenses that have a maximum aperture of less than f/2, typically f/1.4, but greater than f/1.0. The lens has been in production since 1959 and carries on to the present day.

History
The name Summilux is a combination of Summum, which is the Latin word for highest, while Lux is for light. The first Summilux was the 50 mm of 1959, followed by a new 50 mm Summilux design in 1961, whose optics remained unchanged until replaced by the 50 mm Summilux-M ASPH of 2004.

Description
The Summilux lenses have a maximum f-number of f/1.4, f/1.5 or occasionally f/1.7. This one to 1.5 stops lower than Leica's Noctilux lenses, but the Summilux lenses are smaller as a result. Summilux lenses are designed for low-light photography.

Market position
The Summilux lenses are less expensive than the Noctilux lenses, which has a smaller f-number. However they are bigger, heavier and more expensive than the Summicron.

List of Summilux lenses

For the Leica M mount
 Summilux-M 21 mm  ASPH.
 Summilux-M 24 mm  ASPH.
 Summilux-M 28 mm  ASPH.
 Summilux 35 mm 
 Summilux-M 35 mm  ASPH. FLE Version V
 Summilux-M 35 mm  ASPH. FLE "Short Focus" Version VI
 Summilux 50 mm 
 Summilux-M 50 mm  ASPH.
 Summilux-M 75 mm 
 Summilux-M 90 mm  ASPH.

For the Leica R mount
 Summilux-R 35 mm 
 Summilux-R 50 mm  1st version
 Summilux-R 50 mm  2nd version
 Summilux-R 50 mm  3rd version – 1997 (ROM contacts)
 Summilux-R 80mm 

For the Leica L Mount
 Summilux-TL 35 mm  ASPH.
 Summilux-SL 50 mm  ASPH.

By Panasonic
 Panasonic Leica DG Vario-Summilux 10-25 mm  ASPH.
 Panasonic Lumix G Leica DG Summilux 12 mm  ASPH.
 Panasonic Leica DG Summilux 15 mm  ASPH.
 Panasonic Leica Summilux DG 25 mm 
 Panasonic Leica DG Summilux 25 mm  II ASPH.

References

External links
 Summilux.net lens review site 
 Overgaard Leica 35mm Summilux article 
 Overgaard Leica lens compendium of all Summilux lenses 

Leica lenses
Photographic lenses